Volosovo is the name of several inhabited localities in Russia.

Leningrad Oblast
As of 2022, two inhabited localities in Leningrad Oblast bear this name.

Urban localities
Volosovo, Volosovsky District, Leningrad Oblast, a town in Volosovsky District; incorporated as Volosovskoye Settlement Municipal Formation

Rural localities
Volosovo, Volkhovsky District, Leningrad Oblast, a village in Potaninskoye Settlement Municipal Formation of Volkhovsky District

Moscow Oblast
As of 2022, two rural localities in Moscow Oblast bear this name:
Volosovo, Chekhovsky District, Moscow Oblast, a village in Stremilovskoye Rural Settlement of Chekhovsky District
Volosovo, Klinsky District, Moscow Oblast, a village in Petrovskoye Rural Settlement of Klinsky District

Nizhny Novgorod Oblast
As of 2022, one rural locality in Nizhny Novgorod Oblast bears this name:
Volosovo, Nizhny Novgorod Oblast, a village in Bolsheokulovsky Selsoviet of Navashinsky District

Novgorod Oblast
As of 2022, one rural locality in Novgorod Oblast bears this name:
Volosovo, Novgorod Oblast, a village in Opechenskoye Settlement of Borovichsky District

Pskov Oblast
As of 2022, three rural localities in Pskov Oblast bear this name:
Volosovo, Gdovsky District, Pskov Oblast, a village in Gdovsky District
Volosovo, Plyussky District, Pskov Oblast, a village in Plyussky District
Volosovo, Pskovsky District, Pskov Oblast, a village in Pskovsky District

Tver Oblast
As of 2022, seven rural localities in Tver Oblast bear this name:
Volosovo, Kalininsky District, Tver Oblast, a village in Kalininsky District
Volosovo, Kalyazinsky District, Tver Oblast, a village in Kalyazinsky District
Volosovo, Likhoslavlsky District, Tver Oblast, a village in Likhoslavlsky District
Volosovo, Sonkovsky District, Tver Oblast, a village in Sonkovsky District
Volosovo, Torzhoksky District, Tver Oblast, a village in Torzhoksky District
Volosovo, Vesyegonsky District, Tver Oblast, a village in Vesyegonsky District
Volosovo, Zubtsovsky District, Tver Oblast, a village in Zubtsovsky District

Vladimir Oblast
As of 2022, two rural localities in Vladimir Oblast bear this name:
Volosovo, Petushinsky District, Vladimir Oblast, a village in Petushinsky District
Volosovo, Sobinsky District, Vladimir Oblast, a selo in Sobinsky District

Vologda Oblast
As of 2022, two rural localities in Vologda Oblast bear this name:
Volosovo, Ust-Kubinsky District, Vologda Oblast, a village in Nikolsky Selsoviet of Ust-Kubinsky District
Volosovo, Ustyuzhensky District, Vologda Oblast, a village in Nikiforovsky Selsoviet of Ustyuzhensky District

Yaroslavl Oblast
As of 2022, four rural localities in Yaroslavl Oblast bear this name:
Volosovo, Borisoglebsky District, Yaroslavl Oblast, a village in Andreyevsky Rural Okrug of Borisoglebsky District
Volosovo, Trofimovsky Rural Okrug, Danilovsky District, Yaroslavl Oblast, a village in Trofimovsky Rural Okrug of Danilovsky District
Volosovo, Yermakovsky Rural Okrug, Danilovsky District, Yaroslavl Oblast, a village in Yermakovsky Rural Okrug of Danilovsky District
Volosovo, Pervomaysky District, Yaroslavl Oblast, a village in Prechistensky Rural Okrug of Pervomaysky District